Car No.34 (formerly Car No. 7 of the Snaefell Mountain Railway) in the Isle of Man is the only non-passenger tramcar on the Manx Electric Railway .

In late 1994 work began on the construction of a replica works car on the Snaefell Mountain Railway No. 7 (colloquially known as "Maria") intended to be an historical representation of this car as an attraction for the line's centenary the following year.  After limited use on the mountain line and following a change of railway management the car was  deemed to not be of use so it was converted to the 3' 0" gauge for use on the coastal line and re-numbered 34 in sequence with the line's other power cars.  It is now painted in high-visibility yellow and red livery and fitted with a large diesel generator so it can be used in the event of power failure. It is unlikely to ever return to its original line.

References

Sources
 Manx Manx Electric Railway Fleetlist (2002) Manx Electric Railway Society
 Island Island Images: Manx Electric Railway Pages (2003) Jon Wornham
 Official Official Tourist Department Page (2009) Isle Of Man Heritage Railways

Manx Electric Railway